Chris Hala'ufia (born 24 October 1978) is a back row forward who plays rugby union football for English club London Welsh in the Aviva Premiership and Tonga. He is well known for his ability to break tackles. Hala'ufia originally made a name for himself with Bradford & Bingley RFC, when he made his début in the English game in the 2003–4 season. At that time Bradford & Bingley were in North 1, but ran away with the league title, with Hala'uifa contributing 27 tries during the campaign. The club also won the Intermediate Cup at Twickenham in April 2004, Hala'uifa's final game for the club before moving on to Italy for the 2004/5 season.

Hala'ufia returned to England to play for Rotherham Titans in the 2005/6 season where he made his name and reputation as someone with the potential to play at the highest level. He subsequently moved to Harlequins for 2006–08 along with David Strettle.

He moved onto London Irish for the 2008–09 season, where he appeared in 31 out of 34 games and helped take them to the Guinness Premiership Final against Leicester Tigers.

In January 2010 he was banned for four weeks for punching an opposing player. In October 2011 he was suspended for seven weeks for dangerous tackling.

In June 2014, it was confirmed that Hala'ufia had signed for Welsh region the Scarlets. But, he left the club just months after joining, without making a single appearance. He moved to London Welsh, originally on loan, before making the move permanent in October 2014.

In May 2015 he was banned for five matches for striking Laurence Pearce during a game.

References

External links
London Irish profile
StatBunker.com profile

1978 births
Bradford RFC players
Harlequin F.C. players
Living people
London Irish players
London Welsh RFC players
People from Vavaʻu
Rotherham Titans players
Tonga international rugby union players
Tongan rugby union players
Tongan expatriate rugby union players
Expatriate rugby union players in England
Tongan expatriate sportspeople in England
Rugby union flankers
Rugby union number eights